Sailing competitions at the 2015 Pan American Games in Toronto will be held from July 12 to 19 at the Royal Canadian Yacht Club's ferry station and parking lot on the mainland side of the harbour. A total of ten events will be contested (two for men, three for women and five mixed gender events).

Originally nine medal events were scheduled to be contested at the games, but a tenth medal event (the women's 49erFX) was added to the program. This was done to get the event to have more gender equality.

The top placing athlete from North America and South America in the men's laser and women's laser radial, will all qualify for the sailing competitions at the 2016 Summer Olympics in Rio de Janeiro, Brazil.

Competition schedule

The following is the competition schedule for the sailing competitions:

Competition format
All ten classes will contest a series of opening races and conclude with a medal race which will consist of the top 50% of the boats (with a five boat minimum). All boats will compete in a twelve series opening race, except the RS:X and 49erFX (which will compete in a sixteen race opening series). The first six days will see all boats compete in two races each except the RS:X and 49erFX, which will compete in three races on the first four days of racing. The last two days of competition will each see five medal races.

Medal table

Medalists

Men's events

Women's events

Open events

Participating nations
A total of 21 countries have qualified athletes. The number of athletes a nation has entered is in parentheses beside the name of the country.

Qualification

A total of 140 sailors and 85 boats will qualify to compete at the games. A nation may enter a maximum of one boat in each of the ten events and a maximum of eighteen athletes. Each event will have different qualifying events that began in 2013. However, on December 22, 2014 the Pan American Sailing Federation announced the total quota was raised to 148 athletes and 93 boats (with the laser and laser standard events each receiving an additional four boats). This was done because the event became an Olympic qualifier.

See also
Sailing at the 2016 Summer Olympics

References

 
Events at the 2015 Pan American Games
Pan American Games
2015